"Don't Worry 'bout a Thing" is a song written by Kristyn Osborn and Jason Deere, recorded by American country music group SHeDAISY.  It was released in January 2005 as the third and final single from their album Sweet Right Here.  The song was the fourth and final Top Ten hit of the group's career, reaching a peak of number 7 on the U.S. Billboard Hot Country Songs charts.

Content
The song asks the listener if they have ever experienced any of a series of unfortunate events, some general (“Ever lost your luggage, your marbles your house?”) and some specific to those in the music industry (“Ever been accused of murder on Music Row?”), in the verses; the chorus goes on to explain that such predicaments are a part of life and not to worry about them.

Critical reception
Allmusic critic Johnny Loftus described the song as being one of the standout tracks on Sweet Right Here. In his review, he said that the three members of SHeDAISY "take the song's message to heart, loosening up and having a good time… 'blah blah blah'-ing their way through the pre-chorus".

Music video
The song's music video, directed by Trey Fanjoy, alternates between performance footage and shots of SHeDAISY in a convertible. Computer-generated animation of the song's lyrics also appears on screen.

Chart performance
"Don't Worry 'bout a Thing" debuted at number 56 on the U.S. Billboard Hot Country Singles & Tracks for the week of February 5, 2005.

Year-end charts

References

2005 singles
SHeDAISY songs
Music videos directed by Trey Fanjoy
Song recordings produced by Dann Huff
Lyric Street Records singles
Songs written by Jason Deere
Songs written by Kristyn Osborn
2004 songs